Stormont Loch is a small irregular lowland freshwater loch, that is partially in-filled. It located in a nature reserve owned by the Scottish Wildlife Trust,  on a north-east to south-west orientation and is 2 miles southeast of Blairgowrie in Perth and Kinross.

Geography
Stormont Loch is of glacial origin and is formed as a type of geographic formation known as a kettle.  The loch is of national importance as it provides a complete dating record for vegetation changes over the last 13000 years.

The loch is a designated Site of Special Scientific Interest (SSSI), as well as forming part of a Special Area of Conservation.

See also
 List of lochs in Scotland

References

Freshwater lochs of Scotland
Lochs of Perth and Kinross
Tay catchment
Protected areas of Perth and Kinross
Sites of Special Scientific Interest in Scotland
Conservation in the United Kingdom
Special Areas of Conservation in Scotland
Birdwatching sites in Scotland